Clifton Lock is a lock on River Thames in Oxfordshire, England. It is located south of the village of Clifton Hampden and north of Long Wittenham. It is at the start of the Clifton Cut, which bypasses the river to the north of Long Wittenham.
The lock was completed in 1822 by the Thames Navigation Commissioners.

The main weir, which was built thirteen years later than the lock, runs across the old navigation of the river. A smaller weir runs just above the lock.

History

Clifton is one of the few lock sites on the non-tidal river where there was not a pre-existing weir and flash lock, although there was an important ferry. Problems to navigation had long been recognised and the first suggestions for creating a lock "near Clifton Ferry" occurred in 1793, being raised again in 1811.

The construction of the lock cut was delayed because the owner of the land was "a lunatic", but it was eventually completed in 1822 together with the lock. No weir was built at the time, giving rise to complaints. In 1826, the Lord Mayor of London visited Oxford by boat, and the City Barge, shallop and attendant boats were "detained at Clifton a considerable length of time."

The weir was eventually erected on the old navigation in 1835 so the towpath around the old navigation channel fell into disuse. It was enlarged by 1877 and a tumbling bay was created close to the lock. The lock cut bridges were rebuilt in 1884.

Access to the Lock

The lock is at the end of a long track which starts on the A415 road to Abingdon just opposite Fullamor Farm to the west of Clifton Hampden village. This is joined by another track running southwestwards from High Street in Clifton Hampden, then continues to the lock. These tracks are not public roads as local signs state "Farm access only".

Reach above the lock

The Clifton cut takes the navigation for nearly a mile before the reaching the weir to the river's natural course past Long Wittenham. The reach is alongside farmland, crossed about halfway along by the Appleford Railway Bridge. Just before Sutton Bridge the river again divides between an old course, now a weirstream, past the old mill at Sutton Courtenay and Sutton Pools; with the navigation following the Culham Cut.

The river meander has some public footpath access, although the Thames Path follows the navigation cutting, and the northern bank all the way to Culham Lock.

See also

 Locks on the River Thames

External links
 View from Clifton Lock from geograph.org.uk

References

1822 establishments in England
Locks of Oxfordshire
Locks on the River Thames